Jefferson Alexander Cepeda (born 16 June 1998) is an Ecuadorian cyclist, who currently rides for UCI WorldTeam . One of his cousins, also named Jefferson Cepeda, is also a cyclist, on the  team.

Career
In October 2020, he was named in the startlist for the 2020 Giro d'Italia. His first race in the  colors will be the Deutschland Tour.

Major results

2017
 2nd Time trial, National Under-23 Road Championships
 4th Time trial, National Road Championships
2018
 National Under-23 Road Championships
1st  Time trial
3rd Road race
 5th Time trial, Pan American Under-23 Road Championships
 6th Road race, South American Games
2019
 1st Stage 4 Clásico RCN
 National Road Championships
2nd Road race
3rd Time trial
 3rd Road race, Pan American Under-23 Road Championships
 9th Overall Tour de l'Avenir
1st Stage 10
2020
 10th Overall Tour de Savoie Mont-Blanc
2021
 1st  Road race, National Road Championships
 1st  Overall Tour de Savoie Mont-Blanc
1st  Points classification
1st Stage 2
 4th Overall Tour of the Alps
1st  Young rider classification
2022
 2nd Overall Giro di Sicilia
1st  Young rider classification
2023
 3rd Time trial, National Road Championships
 7th Trofeo Laigueglia

Grand Tour general classification results timeline

References

External links

1998 births
Living people
Ecuadorian male cyclists
People from Sucumbíos Province
Cyclists at the 2019 Pan American Games
Pan American Games competitors for Ecuador
21st-century Ecuadorian people